Plummer's nail is a clinical sign in which there is onycholysis, or separation of the nail from the nail bed, particularly affecting the ring and little fingers. It occurs in patients with thyrotoxicosis. About 5% of hyperthyroid patients display abnormal nail changes. Plummer's nail is also associated with psoriasis, traumatic injury, and allergic contact dermatitis.

The sign is named after Henry Stanley Plummer.

See also 
 Pili bifurcati
 List of cutaneous conditions

References

External links 

Conditions of the skin appendages